Boniface Merande (born 13 February 1962) is a retired Kenyan long-distance runner, who represented his native country at the 1988 Summer Olympics in Seoul, South Korea. Four years later he finished in 14th position in the 1992 Olympic Marathon.

He finished seventh at the 1993 World Championships in 2:18:52 hours. He also won a bronze medal in 3000 metres steeplechase at the 1989 African Championships and finished 14th at the 1992 Summer Olympics.

Achievements
All results regarding marathon, unless stated otherwise

References

External links

1962 births
Living people
Kenyan male long-distance runners
Kenyan male steeplechase runners
Athletes (track and field) at the 1988 Summer Olympics
Athletes (track and field) at the 1992 Summer Olympics
Olympic athletes of Kenya
Kenyan male cross country runners